Churet (also Romanized as Chūret and Chūrat) is a village in Garmab Rural District, Chahardangeh District, Sari County, Mazandaran Province, Iran. At the 2006 census, its population was 1,374, in 276 families.

Churet Lake is located near this village.

References 

Populated places in Sari County